Zsolt Karacs (born 30 October 1966) is a Hungarian sports shooter. He competed in two events at the 1996 Summer Olympics.

References

External links
 

1966 births
Living people
Hungarian male sport shooters
Olympic shooters of Hungary
Shooters at the 1996 Summer Olympics
People from Püspökladány
Sportspeople from Hajdú-Bihar County